William Henry Ferry (April 1819 in Remsen, Oneida County, New York – March 26, 1880 in Lake Forest, Lake County, Illinois) was an American politician from New York.

Life
He was the son of Heman Ferry (1786–1856) and Roxanna (Burchard) Ferry (c.1796–1842). He attended Amherst College for some time. He married Mary Ann Williams (b. 1816), and they had seven children.

He was a member of the New York State Senate (19th D.) in 1860 and 1861. On March 25, 1861, he was elected President pro tempore of the State Senate.

He was a director of the Galena and Chicago Union Railroad.

He was buried at the Rosehill Cemetery and Mausoleum in Chicago

William was the cousin of William Montague Ferry.

References

Sources
 The New York Civil List compiled by Franklin Benjamin Hough, Stephen C. Hutchins and Edgar Albert Werner (1867; pg. 442)
 Biographical Sketches of the State Officers and Members of the Legislature of the State of New York by William D. Murphy (1861; pg. 50ff)
 Ferry genealogy at Genealogy.com
 14th Annual Report of the Directors of the Galena & Chicago Union Raiulroad (1861; pg. 7)

External links

1819 births
1880 deaths
Republican Party New York (state) state senators
People from Remsen, New York
People from Lake Forest, Illinois
Amherst College alumni
19th-century American railroad executives
19th-century American politicians